The Stanisław Rolbieski tenement is a historical habitation building located at 96 Gdańska Street, in Bydgoszcz.

Location 
The building stands on the eastern side of Gdańska Street between Zamoyskiego street and Chodkiewicz street.

It stands close to remarkable tenements in the same street:
 Villa Carl Grosse at 84;
 Otto Riedl Tenement at 85;
 Villa Hugo Hecht at 88/90;
 Tenement at 91 Gdańska street.

History
The house was built in 1891-1892, commissioned by Hugo Felix Franz Hecht, a timber merchant an dealer, and realized by  Józef Święcicki. At the time, the address was 120 Danziger Straße.

It was the last part of a series of six close stylish buildings ordered by Hugo Hecht in Gdańska Street and realized by Józef Święcicki, together with buildings located at 88/90 and 92/94.

During interwar period, the building belonged to the engineer Stanisław Rolbieski, manager of Karbid Wielkopolski SA. He was an entrepreneur, activist, and town councilor of the city, founder of the factory Kabel Polski Sp zoo in Bydgoszcz

During the Nazi occupation the edifice housed the German Labour Front.

Architecture
The building has the homogeneous style of the other habitation houses commissioned by Hugo Hecht (Nr.88/90 & 92/94), with a facade decoration referring to the French Neo-Renaissance forms.
The symmetry axis running between each buildings is still visible in the shape of a massive roof topped bay window.

In the same area, Józef Święcicki also realized other edifices:
 Hotel "Pod Orlem" at 14 Gdańska street;
 Oskar Ewald Tenement at 30 Gdańska street;
 Józef Święcicki tenement at 63 Gdańska street;
 Tenement at 86 Gdańska street;
 Villa Hugo Hecht at 88-90 Gdańska street;
 Hugo Hecht tenement at 92-94 Gdańska street;
 Tenement at 1 Plac Wolności.

Gallery

See also

 Bydgoszcz
 Gdanska Street in Bydgoszcz
 Hugo Hecht tenement in Bydgoszcz
 Józef Święcicki
 Villa Hugo Hecht in Bydgoszcz
 Carbide Factory, Bydgoszcz

References

Bibliography 
 

Buildings and structures on Gdańska Street, Bydgoszcz
Buildings by Józef Święcicki
Residential buildings completed in 1892